The Death of Salvador Dalí  is a 2005 American fantasy short film written and directed by Delaney Bishop. The plot concerns Salvador Dalí consulting Sigmund Freud on how to depict madness in his artwork.

Cast
 Dita Von Teese as Gala Dalí
 Salvador Benavides as Salvador Dalí
 Mary Burton as Angela
 Alejandro Cardenas as Luis Buñuel
 Robert Cesario as Sigmund Freud
 Raphael Edwards as Paul Éluard
 Alan Shearman as André Breton

Awards
The film won the Jury's Special Award for Excellence in Cinematography at the Aarhus Film Festival, in Denmark in 2006.
Salvador Benavides won Best Actor for his role as Salvador Dalí at the Nosotros Film Festival on August 27, 2006 in Los Angeles. Dita Von Teese won the award for Best Female Performance for her depiction of Dalí's wife Gala, at The Beverly Hills Film Festival in 2006.

External links 
 

American biographical films
American fantasy films
American short films
2005 short films
2005 films
Cultural depictions of Salvador Dalí
Cultural depictions of Luis Buñuel
Biographical films about painters
Films about psychiatry
Cultural depictions of Sigmund Freud
2000s English-language films
2000s American films